Auengrund is a municipality in the district of Hildburghausen, in Thuringia, Germany.

References

Municipalities in Thuringia
Hildburghausen (district)